Heidi Zacher (born March 17, 1988) is a German freestyle skier, specializing in ski cross.

Zacher competed at the 2010 Winter Olympics for Germany. She placed 19th in the qualifying round in ski cross, to advance to the knockout stages. She did not finish her first round heat, failing to advance.

As of April 2013, her best finish at the World Championships is 7th, in 2011.

Zacher made her World Cup debut in January 2009. As of April 2013, she has one World Cup victory, coming  at St. Johann in 2010/11. She also has eighteen other World Cup podium finishes. Her best World Cup overall finish in ski cross is 2nd, in 2010/11.

World Cup Podiums

References

External links
  (freestyle)
  (alpine)
 
 
 

1984 births
Living people
Olympic freestyle skiers of Germany
Freestyle skiers at the 2010 Winter Olympics
Freestyle skiers at the 2014 Winter Olympics
People from Bad Tölz
Sportspeople from Upper Bavaria
German female freestyle skiers
21st-century German women